Calymniops is a monotypic moth genus of the family Erebidae erected by George Hampson in 1926. Its only species, Calymniops trapezata, was first described by Frederic Moore in 1887. It is found in India, Sri Lanka, Japan and parts of North America.

Description
Its wingspan is about 32 mm.

References

Calpinae
Monotypic moth genera
Moths of Asia
Moths described in 1887